The Ministry of Education (MOE; ;) is a ministry of the Government of Singapore responsible for the formulation and implementation of policies related to the education in Singapore.

Organisational structure
The ministry currently oversees 10 statutory boards which includes 5 polytechnics and 2 institutes: SkillsFuture Singapore, Singapore Examinations and Assessment Board, ISEAS–Yusof Ishak Institute, Institute of Technical Education, Singapore Polytechnic, Ngee Ann Polytechnic, Temasek Polytechnic, Nanyang Polytechnic, Republic Polytechnic and Science Centre, Singapore.

In 2016, a new statutory board under the Ministry of Education (MOE), SkillsFuture Singapore (SSG), was formed to drive and coordinate the implementation of SkillsFuture. It took over some of the functions currently performed by the Singapore Workforce Development Agency (WDA) and absorbed the Committee for Private Education (CPE).

Unions
Civil servants employed by the Ministry of Education are organised into several Unions, including the Singapore Teachers' Union, Singapore Chinese Teachers' Union, Singapore Malay Teachers' Union and Singapore Tamil Teachers' Union for Education Officers; and the Amalgamated Union of Public Employees for the non-Education Officers. All these unions are affiliates of the National Trades Union Congress.

Statutory boards

 SkillsFuture Singapore
 Singapore Examinations and Assessment Board
 ISEAS–Yusof Ishak Institute
 Institute of Technical Education
 Singapore Polytechnic
 Ngee Ann Polytechnic 
 Temasek Polytechnic 
 Nanyang Polytechnic 
 Republic Polytechnic 
 Science Centre, Singapore

Impact 
The Government of Singapore invests heavily in education to equip citizens with the necessary knowledge and skills to compete in the global marketplace. Singapore currently spends around a fifth of its national budget on education. To boost its economic standing, the Government of Singapore created a mandate that most Singaporeans learn English. It is the language of governance and administration in Singapore and English is also the medium of instruction in most, if not all, schools in Singapore. As a result, the country rose from one of the most impoverished Asian countries to one with the strongest economies and highest standards of living.

SkillsFuture 
The SkillsFuture initiative was introduced in 2015 to support Singapore's next stage of economic advancement by providing lifelong learning and skills development opportunities for Singaporeans. SkillsFuture aims at unlocking the full potential of all Singaporeans, regardless of background and industry. The program contains several key initiatives, such as SkillsFuture Credit and SkillsFuture Earn and Learn. SkillsFuture caters to many stakeholders, with initiatives centred on students, adult learners, employers, and training providers. In general, SkillsFuture involves a broad array of policy instruments targeting a wider range of beneficiaries over a longer-term horizon – schooling years, early career, mid-career or silver years – with a variety of resources available to help them attain mastery of skills.

Every Singapore citizen from the age of 25 is given S$500 (approximately $370) by the Singapore government for the SkillsFuture Credit to invest in their personal learning. This sum can be used for continuing education courses in local tertiary institutions, as well as short courses provided by MOOC providers such as Udemy, Coursera, and edX.

By the end of 2017, the SkillsFuture Credit has been utilised by over 285,000 Singaporeans. There were more than 18,000 SkillsFuture credit-approved courses available at that time. As of 2016, there were also a total of 40 Earn and Learn Programmes.

SkillsFuture has established a multi-level training system with dozens of initiatives and programs targeting the different skill-training needs of different social groups, such as students and employees in different career stages. Moreover, SkillsFuture also invests in forms of industry collaboration to uplift the broad base of private companies, and strengthen collaboration between training institutions, unions, trade associations, and employers to develop the skills of the Singaporean workforce. In terms of funding, according to the Singaporean government budget report, a provision of $220 million has been made for SSG in the fiscal year 2018 to implement plans, policies and strategies to support skills development programs under SkillsFuture.

Ministers
With the expanding scope of education in Singapore and the implementation of SkillsFuture in 2016, the Ministry was led by two ministers; Minister for Education (Schools), who oversees the pre-school, primary, secondary, and junior college education; and Minister for Education (Higher Education and Skills), who oversees the ITE, polytechnic, university and SkillsFuture education. In 2018, the Ministry returned to being headed by one minister.

The Ministry is headed by the Minister for Education, who is appointed as part of the Cabinet of Singapore. The incumbent minister is Chan Chun Sing from the People's Action Party.

References

Citations

Sources

External links 

Singapore Government Directory Interactive — Ministry of Education

Education in Singapore
Education, Ministry of
Singapore
1955 establishments in Singapore
Singapore